Bellas Artes is a station along Line 2 and Line 8 of the Mexico City Metro system.  It is located in the Colonia Centro neighborhood of the Cuauhtémoc municipality of Mexico City, on the junction of Avenida Juárez and Eje Central Lázaro Cárdenas, on the eastern end of the Alameda Central, west of the city centre.  In 2019, the station had an average ridership of 51,440 passengers per day.

Name and pictogram
The station is named for the Palacio de Bellas Artes opera house and museum, opened in 1934 and located next to the station. The pictogram depicts a stylized version of the palace's art nouveau façade as seen from the main southern entrance.

History

The Line 2 section of the station was among the first to be opened in the system on 14 September 1970; the transfer with Line 8 was inaugurated on 20 July 1994.

French President Jacques Chirac inaugurated a treasured Hector Guimard style art nouveau Paris Métro entrance next to the western wing of the Palace on 14 November 1998. The entrance was a gift given in return for the mural El pensamiento y el alma huicholes by Huichol artist Santos de la Torre presented in 1997 to the Paris Métro that is now on display at the Palais Royal – Musée du Louvre station.

General information
Inside the station, the platforms in Line 2 show reproductions of Mesoamerican art.  Similarly, the Line 8 platforms are decorated with colourful murals, with Mexican and French motifs: a reproduction of one of the Bonampak murals by Rina Lazo; Visión francesa sobre México by Jean-Paul Chambas, and Visión de un artista mexicano sobre Francia by Rodolfo Morales.

As many stations in the Metro network, Bellas Artes has a cyber center, where users can access internet through a computer; the service is free and it is open from 8:00 to 20:00. From here, it is also possible to transfer to Metrobús Line 4 and Line A of the trolleybus service.

Ridership

See also 
 List of Mexico City metro stations

References

External links 
 

Bellas Artes
Mexico City Metro stations in Cuauhtémoc, Mexico City
Railway stations opened in 1970
Art Nouveau architecture in Mexico City
Art Nouveau railway stations
1970 establishments in Mexico
1994 establishments in Mexico
Railway stations opened in 1994
Mexico City Metro Line 8 stations
Accessible Mexico City Metro stations
Alameda Central